Hekuli is a Village Development Committee  in Dang Deokhuri District in Lumbini Province of south-western Nepal. At the time of the 1991 Nepal census it had a population of 8,512 persons living in 1139 individual households.

References

External links
UN map of the municipalities of Dang Deokhuri District

Populated places in Dang District, Nepal